Wu-Tang Clan is an American hip-hop group.

Wu-Tang may also refer to:

 Wu-Tang: Shaolin Style, a 1999 video game
 Wu-tang (dance), a form of hip-hop dance
 Wu Tang (Qing dynasty) (吳棠), a Viceroy of Min-Zhe from 1866 to 1867
 Wudang School, sometimes also referred to as the Wu-tang School or Wu-Tang Clan, a fictional martial arts school mentioned in several works of wuxia fiction

See also
 Wudang (disambiguation), spelled Wutang or Wu-tang in Wade–Giles
 Wu Dan (disambiguation)
 Tang Wu (fl. 1940s–1960s), an ambassador of China to Egypt and other countries